William O'Neill is an American college men's ice hockey coach. O'Neill has been the head coach at Salem State University since 1981, winning more than 600 games in that time.

Career
O'Neill's college career began in 1975 with the Boston University Terriers. After playing in just one game as a freshman, he grew into his role as a depth defensemen and helped BU win the National Championship in 1978. After graduating, O'Neill attended a tryout for the Boston Bruins but, when nothing materialized, he signed on as a graduate assistant at Norwich University.

After two years with the Cadets, O'Neill was named as the head coach at Salem State. He saw a good deal of success in the early part of his tenure, leading the Vikings to five 20-win seasons in the span of ten years and made four consecutive appearances in the NCAA Tournament. After the mid-90's, the program declined slightly; though they routinely posted winning records, the team didn't make any NCAA appearance for almost 20 years. Even when Salem State won the inaugural MASCAC tournament championship, the league hadn't yet been given an automatic bid so O'Neill's championship team wasn't invited to participate.

Despite the lack of sustained success in recent years, O'Neill continues to lead the Vikings. Near the end of the 2019 season, O'Neill recorded his 600th victory, becoming just the fourth coach in NCAA history to achieve that feat with one team. When the program cancelled its 2020–21 season due to the COVID-19 pandemic, O'Neill was 12th all-time in wins with 606. At that time he was the longest-tenured coach at any NCAA program and had more wins than any active bench boss at the Division III level. As of 2021, only Jerry York, at Boston College, possesses more wins among active coaches.

Head Coaching Record

See also
List of college men's ice hockey coaches with 400 wins

References

Year of birth missing (living people)
Living people
Boston University Terriers men's ice hockey players
NCAA men's ice hockey national champions
Salem State University faculty
Salem State Vikings men's ice hockey coaches